Gilles Durant, sieur de la Bergerie (1554 – 1614 or 1615), born in Clermont-Ferrand, was a lawyer at the Parlement of Paris, known as one of the authors of the Satire Ménippée.

Works 
In addition to his participation in the Satire Ménippée, he also is the author of other poems, as well as imitations of David's Psalms.

Odes, songs, sonnets...

References

External links 
 Writing and Arrangement (Discogs)
 Gilles Durant de la Bergerie (1550–1605) – Ma belle si ton âme (YouTube)

16th-century French poets
French male poets
Writers from Clermont-Ferrand
1554 births
1614 deaths
16th-century French lawyers